Phoebe Ann Pickering Hoyt Jenks ( – ) was an American portrait painter.  

In 1860 she married Boston silversmith Lewis E. Jenks.

Jenks began painting at age 29 and studied under Benjamin Curtis Porter and D. T. Kendrick.  She became a portrait painter in Boston, specializing in portraits of women and children.  

Phoebe A. Jenks died on 20 January 1907 in Boston.

References 

Created via preloaddraft
1847 births
1907 deaths
People from Portsmouth, New Hampshire
American women painters
19th-century American painters